Andrea Bordeaux (born March 31, 1987 in Texas) is an American actress and model. She is best known for her role as Harley Hidoko in the TV series NCIS: Los Angeles.

Life and career 
Bordeaux grew up in Texas. She expressed an interest for acting since her childhood and had  her first stage experience at the age of 14.

In 2005, she moved to New York City and studied at the theater of Pace University. One year later, she moved to the privately owned New York Conservatory for Dramatic Arts. In late 2006, Bordeaux was discovered as a model and gained further recognition. In 2010, she had her first role in the TV series Law & Order: Special Victims Unit.

In 2013 and 2014, she played Neda in the TNT series Rizzoli & Isles. Further guest appearances followed in series such as Criminal Minds. In 2017, she had her breakthrough in the ninth season of NCIS: Los Angeles, playing Harley Hidoko.

In 2021, she played the lead role of Ella McFair in Starz comedy Run the World. She was fired from the role during production of the second season for refusing to comply with the production's COVID-19 vaccine mandate.

Filmography

Film

Television

References

External links 
 
 Biography at Clear Talent Group

1987 births
American film actresses
American television actresses
Living people
Pace University alumni
21st-century African-American women
21st-century African-American people
African-American actresses
Actresses from Texas
20th-century African-American people
20th-century African-American women